The Military ranks of Benin are the military insignia used by the Benin Armed Forces.  Being a former colony of France, Benin shares a rank structure similar to that of France.

Commissioned officer ranks
The rank insignia of commissioned officers.

Other ranks
The rank insignia of non-commissioned officers and enlisted personnel.

References

External links
 
 

Benin
Military of Benin